William Henry Stacpoole, D.D. (b. 17 January 1787; d. 29 January 1847) was a 19th-century Anglican priest in Ireland.

Stacpoole was educated at Trinity College, Dublin. He was Dean of Kilfenora from 1825 until his death.

References

1787 births
1847 deaths
Alumni of Trinity College Dublin
Deans of Kilfenora
19th-century Irish Anglican priests